Hải Hà is a rural district of Quảng Ninh province in the northeastern region of Vietnam. As of 2003, the district had a population of 50,878. The district covers an area of 495 km². The district capital lies at Quảng Hà.

Administrative divisions
Quảng Hà, Quảng Minh, Quảng Thành, Quảng Thắng, Phú Hải, Quảng Chính, Quảng Trung, Quảng Điền, Quảng Phong, Quảng Long, Quảng Sơn, Đường Hoa, Tiến Tới, Quảng Đức, Quảng Thịnh and Cái Chiên.

References

Districts of Quảng Ninh province